The Developing Countries Vaccine Manufacturers Network (DCVMN) is a voluntary non-partisan public health alliance of health organizations and vaccine manufacturers.  It has the goal of protecting people globally against known and emerging infectious diseases through the provision of a consistent supply of high quality vaccines at affordable prices for developing countries, to achieve vaccine equity.  DCVMN includes manufacturers in Brazil, China, Cuba, India, Indonesia, Mexico, South Africa and other low and middle income countries (LMICs). It was established in 2000/2001, and is headquartered in Switzerland. As of 2021, the President is Sai D. Prasad, and the CEO is Rajinder Suri.

In 2018, DCVMN members supplied more than half of the 2.36 billion doses of vaccines used globally by UNICEF.  In 2019, a survey of 41 DCVMN members assessed their ability to use  technology platforms, cell cultures and filling technologies for the manufacture of drug products. DCVMN members reported that they had the capability to supply over 50 distinct vaccines to 170 countries, totalling more than  3.5 billion vaccine doses annually.

At least 15 manufacturer members have achieved WHO prequalification for their vaccines.
Members are developing and producing novel vaccines for illnesses including neglected tropical diseases:  rotavirus, Japanese encephalitis, pertussis,  haemophilus influenzae, hepatitis B, hepatitis E, meningitis A, cholera, poliovirus, human papillomavirus infection, dengue fever, Chikungunya virus and COVID-19.

Developing countries that have the capacity for production of whole inactivated virus (WIV) and protein-based vaccines may be critical in addressing COVID-19 vaccine access gaps and achieving vaccine equity for LMICs.
As of 29 December 2020, 18 DCVMN members were involved in preclinical or clinical trials for possible COVID-19 vaccines, three of them in Phase III trials. The DCVMN is a vaccine manufacturers partner of COVAX, a worldwide initiative for equitable access to COVID-19 vaccines.

As of 2016, the timeline from a vaccine's first regulatory submission in its country of origin to its approval for use in Sub-Saharan Africa could take up to seven years.
The DCVMN is active in identifying obstacles in the processes of vaccine registration and use. It works to increase coordination of requirements and procedures to improve the prequalification, procurement and supply of vaccines. This can involve governments in different countries, the World Health Organization (WHO), and United Nations agencies such as UNICEF.

The Developing Countries Vaccine Manufacturers Network has received funding from the Bill & Melinda Gates Foundation.

References

External links
 Official website: Developing Countries Vaccine Manufacturers Network

Collaborative projects
Scientific organizations
International medical and health organizations
Vaccination-related organizations
International responses to the COVID-19 pandemic
Deployment of COVID-19 vaccines